This article focuses on ethnic minorities in the Republic of Azerbaijan.

Demographics

According to the 2009 census, ethnic minorities in Azerbaijan represent 8.9% of the population, including Lezgins (the largest minority group, making up 2.0% of the population), Russians (1.3%) and others, such as Talysh, Tats (Muslims and Judeo-Tats), Avars, Georgians, and Ashkenazi Jews, which comprise the remaining 3.9%.

While Azerbaijanis formed a consistent majority, it is worth noting that there was a shift in the demographic trends in modern Azerbaijan even before the collapse of the Soviet Union and the First Nagorno-Karabakh War, that lead to an exodus of some ethnic minorities, notably the Armenians and Russians, and conversely a large influx of Azerbaijani refugees from Armenia and Azerbaijani internally displaced persons from Nagorno-Karabakh and adjacent territories, thus giving Azerbaijan a more homogeneous character.

Background
According to Professor Douglass Blum:

Freedom House has reported, in July 2005, that some ethnic minorities have encountered discrimination in such areas as housing, education, and employment. The United Nations Committee on the Elimination of Racial Discrimination (CERD) noted that, although Azerbaijan had demonstrated improvements by enacting legislation with provisions for racial discrimination, there had been no discrimination related cases prosecuted. In its summary record, the CERD questioned how such legislation would stem the reportedly discriminatory practices of public officials and law enforcement personnel. The CERD also recommended that Azerbaijan broaden its hitherto narrow understanding of discrimination by not only addressing its "most severe and extreme manifestations" but its commonplace occurrence. Concern over the lack of programs to support minority languages or those fostering inter-cultural education was also expressed by the Committee. Azerbaijan has attempted to curb discrimination by enacting laws., although the

Linguistic rights
Article 21 ("State Language") of Section II of the Constitution of Azerbaijan states:

Furthermore, Article 45 ("The Right to Use Native Language") of Section III of the Constitution of Azerbaijan states:

According to the 2007 report by the Council of Europe's Commission against Racism and Intolerance (ECRI):

According to other reports, there have been several complaints of ethnic unrest in Azerbaijan due to the assimilation politic of the government and its treatment of minorities. Among others the Avars, Talysh, Kurds and Tats.

General representation in public and political life
According to the Resolution on the implementation of the Framework Convention for the Protection of National Minorities issued by the Council of Europe in 2004: 

According to the European Commission Against Racism and Intolerance (ECRI), the human right's body of the Council of Europe:

Assimilation
According to the 1998 book “Linguistic Minorities in Central and Eastern Europe”:

The Russian expert on the nationalities issue, Valery Tishkov, stated that Azerbaijan is one of the biggest assimilators of the former Soviet republics, the other two being Georgia and Uzbekistan.

According to Radio Free Europe organization's analyst Liz Fuller, several Azerbaijan's ethnic representatives (such as Magomed Guseinov from the Avar National Council) have voiced public concern about forced assimilation and ethnic cleansing in order to ensure the predominance of Azerbaijani Turks in the country over Lezghins, Avars, Talysh, Tats, Kurds and other minorities.

Armenians 

The vast majority of Armenians in Azerbaijan live in territory controlled by the break-away region Nagorno-Karabakh. Non-official sources estimate that the number Armenians living on Azerbaijani territory outside Nagorno-Karabakh is around 2,000 to 3,000, and almost exclusively comprises persons married to Azeris or of mixed Armenian-Azeri descent. The number of Armenians who are likely not married to Azeris and are not of mixed Armenian-Azeri descent are estimated at 645 (36 men and 609 women) and more than half (378 or 59 per cent of Armenians in Azerbaijan outside Nagorno-Karabakh) live in Baku and the rest in rural areas. They are likely to be the elderly and sick, and probably have no other family members. Armenians in Azerbaijan are at a great risk as long as the Nagorno-Karabakh conflict remains unsettled.

Azerbaijan SSR
During Soviet rule, the question of Karabakh festered for Armenians. The Armenians of Karabakh made claims of economic neglect, charging that Azeri authorities with under-investment in the region in an attempt to keep it impoverished. In addition, Baku placed restrictions on cultural ties with Armenia. Tensions rose in the early 1960s, and in 1968 clashes erupted between Armenians and Azeris in Stepanakert (the capital of Nagorno-Karabakh). The Armenians feared that the Armenian character of Karabakh would disappear as it had in Nakhichevan over the decades, where the Armenian population had disappeared and all of the Armenian monuments were systematically removed and reportedly destroyed by the Azerbaijani authorities. In 1979, Nagorno-Karabakh had a 74% Armenian majority but received no Armenian television broadcasts and had no Armenian institution of higher learning

According to Thomas De Waal:

However, other evidence suggests that the Armenians lived in better conditions in Nagorno-Karabakh than Azerbaijanis. According to Yamskov,

The Soviet laws ensured that in Nagorno-Karabakh "party and state organs were staffed primarily by Armenians who not only ensured Armenian cultural autonomy with Armenian-language newspapers, schools, and arts but strengthened it"

1991 to present

War soon broke out over Nagorno Karabakh and ended in 1994 with the Armenian separatists gaining control over the territory. Turkic nationalism is the leading force in Baku and has undoubtedly contributed to the conflict with the Armenians given the historical enmity between Armenians and Turkey. All the major human rights monitors agreed that the status of Armenians, those married to or those who associate with Armenians, and those who are perceived to be sympathetic to Armenians, is extremely grave. There has also been numerous acts of vandalism against the Armenian Apostolic Church throughout Azerbaijan. The Armenians still remaining in Azerbaijan practically live in virtual hiding, and have also changed their Armenian names and surnames to Azerbaijani names and surnames because they have to maintain an extremely low profile to avoid harassment and physical attacks. They have continued to complain (in private due to fear of attacks) that they remain subject to harassmant and human rights violations and therefore have to hide their identity. Armenians and part Armenians living in Azerbaijan were reported as being refused permission to leave the country. They have also reported that the Department of Visas and Registrations took them off of the list of residents.

A 1993 report from the American Embassy in Baku noted:

According to a 1993 Department of Justice report:

Azerbaijan has been accused of embarking on a campaign beginning in 1998 to completely destroy the vast cemetery of medieval Armenian khachkar gravestones in the archeological site of Julfa, Nakhchivan, an exclave of Azerbaijan. Claims by Armenians that Azerbaijan had undertaken a systematic campaign to destroy and remove the monuments first arose in late 1998, and those charges were renewed in 2002 and again in December 2005 following the final destruction of the site.

Numerous appeals were filed by both Armenian and international organizations, condemning the Azerbaijani government and demanding it desist from such activity. In 2006, Azerbaijan barred European Parliament members from investigating the claims, charging them with a "biased and hysterical approach" to the issue and stating that it would only accept a delegation if it visited Armenian-controlled territory as well.

According to European Commission against Racism and Intolerance (ECRI) 2011 Report on Azerbaijan "the constant negative official and media discourse concerning the Republic of Armenia helps to sustain a negative climate of opinion regarding people of Armenian origin, who remain vulnerable to discrimination."

Germans

Kurds 

The presence of Kurds in Azerbaijan dates back to the 18th century. The area between Karabakh and Zangezur became inhabited by nomadic Kurdish tribes in the early nineteenth century, when a new wave of Kurdish migrants numbering 600 families led by Mihamed Sefi Siltan moved to the Karabakh Khanate from Persia. A smaller number of them also moved here in 1885 from the Ottoman Empire.

There were some 41,000 Kurds residing in Azerbaijan during the Soviet era. Local Kurds had always been on good terms with the Azerbaijani majority, a Kurdish radio station, newspaper and numerous schools attempt to keep Kurdish culture alive, but fewer families bother to teach their mother tongue.

According to Thomas de Waal:

The geographical areas of concentration of Kurds in Azerbaijan were Kelbajar, Lachin, Qubadli and Zangilan districts, sandwiched between Armenia and the Nagorno-Karabakh region of Azerbaijan. In the course of the First Nagorno-Karabakh War, these regions came under occupation of the Armenian forces. As a result, Kurds along with the entire Azerbaijani population of these regions were displaced to other parts of Azerbaijan.

By the 1920s, the Kurdish community in Azerbaijan was considerably diminished, when many of them moved to Armenia where Kurdish villages were created. About the same time Azerbaijan's Kurds had their own region called Red Kurdistan in the Lachin region, which was to the West of Karabakh. In fact, Lachin with the principal towns Kalbajar, Qubadli and Zangilan and the administrative sub-divisions of Karakushlak, Koturli, Murad-Khanli and Kurd-Haji were mostly inhabited by Kurds.  In 1930 it was abolished and most remaining Kurds were progressively recategorized as Azerbaijani. In late 1930s Soviet authorities deported most of the Kurdish population of Azerbaijan and Armenia to Kazakhstan, and Kurds of Georgia also became victims of Stalin’s purges in 1944.

The problem is that the historical record of the Kurds in Azerbaijan is filled with lacunae. For instance, in 1979 there was according to the census no Kurds recorded. Not only did Turkey and Azerbaijan pursue an identical policy against the Kurds, they even employed identical techniques like forced assimilation, manipulation of population figures, settlement of non-Kurds in areas predominantly Kurdish, suppression of publications and abolition of Kurdish as a medium of instruction in schools. Kurdish historical figures such as Sharaf Khan of Bitlis and Ahmad Khani and the Shaddadid dynasty as a whole were described as Azeris. Kurds who retained 'Kurdish' as their nationality on their internal passports as opposed to 'Azeri' were unable to find employment.

Talysh

According to a 1926 census, there were 77,039 in Azerbaijan SSR. From 1959 to 1989, the Talysh were not included as a separate ethnic group in any census, but rather they were included as part of the Turkic-speaking Azerbaijani's, although the Talysh speak an Iranian language. In 1999, the Azerbaijani government claimed there were only 76,800 Talysh in Azerbaijan, but this is believed to be an under-representation given the problems with registering as a Talysh. Some claim that the population of the Talysh inhabiting the southern regions of Azerbaijan is 500,000. Talysh nationalists have always asserted that the number of Talysh in Azerbaijan is substantially higher than the official statistics.

Obtaining accurate statistics is difficult, due to the unavailability of reliable sources, intermarriage, and the decline of the Talysh language. and Radio Free Europe/Radio Liberty   have voiced their concerns about the arrest of Novruzali Mamedov, Chairman of the Talysh Cultural Centre and editor-in-chief of the "Tolyshi Sado" newspaper.

In Azerbaijan SSR
The Talysh identity was strongly suppressed during Soviet times. In the early Soviet period, there were Talysh medium schools, a newspaper called "Red Talysh", and several Talysh language books published, but by end of the 1930s these schools were closed and the Talysh identity was not acknowledged in official statistics, with the Talysh being classified as "Azerbaijani".

From 1991 to present
Historical repression of identity and the inability to practice their culture and language has led the Talysh to an internalized self repression. This makes it hard to gauge support for any type of Talysh movement. According to Hema Kotecha, many Talysh fear being associated with the separatist Talysh-Mughan Autonomous Republic, with Russia, or with Armenia if they acknowledged or attempted to talk about their beliefs in the public sphere. One instance of current repression was when a school in Lerik wanted to invite a poet from Lenkoran to have a party in his honor and for him to speak to Children; the headmaster was told that he would be dismessed if the event went ahead. The fear of the police is also another factor to this silence, although support for a secular democracy and shared Azerbaijani-Talysh feelings towards Nagorno-Karabakh contribute as well.

Lezgins

Lezgins are the largest ethnic minority in Azerbaijan. The UNHCR states that Lezgins make up 40% of the populations of the Qusar and Khachmaz regions and that Greater Baku is 1.8% Lezgin. Official Azerbaijani government statistics state that the Lezgin population is only 2% of the total population of the country, bringing the number to 178,000, however, this figure could be up to double. Arif Yunus suggests that the figure is closer to 250,000-260,000, while some Lezgin nationalists claim that they number more than 700,000. Qusar town is approximately 90 to 95% Lezgin according to the local NGO Helsinki Committee office.

According to the Center for International Development and Conflict Management at the University of Maryland:

According to Thomas de Waal:

According to nationalist Svante E. Cornell:

Russians

Russians are the second largest ethnic minority in Azerbaijan and is also the largest Russian community in the South Caucasus and one of the largest outside of Russia. Since their arrival at the end of the eighteenth century, the Russians have played an important role in all spheres of life, particularly during the Czarist and Soviet period, especially in the capital the city of Baku.

The events of Black January, the economic downturn, and the war with Armenia, coupled with growing pessimism and psychological discomfort, and pressure from the Azerbaijani refugees from Armenia and Azeri internally displaced persons from Nagorno-Karabakh and adjacent territories, led to the exodus of Russian-speaking population of Azerbaijan. Between 1989 and 1999, the numbers of the Russian population fell from 392,000 to 142,000. As of 2009, the Russian population numbered 119,300 people.

A representative of the Molokan (ethnic Russian) community, in an interview on July 21, 2005, reported that there is no conflict between ethnic Russians and Azeris in Azerbaijan and that "there is no intolerance to the Russian language, culture or people" according to a parliamentary official. Similarly, Interfax News Service, on July 6, 2004, reported that a Russian Foreign Ministry representative stated, "We, Russians, have no particular problems in Azerbaijan".

Jews

Gypsies

Foreign Interference
Azerbaijan has claimed that neighboring countries - Armenia, Iran, and, to a lesser extent, Russia - support separatist sentiments in Azerbaijan.

Armenia
In May 2005, Armenia organized the "First International Conference on Talysh Studies". The event was hosted by the Yerevan State University's Iranian Studies Department and the Yerevan-based Center for Iranian Studies in Armenian resort town of Tsaghkadzor. According to Vladimir Socor:

In April 1996, Azerbaijan's National Security Ministry claimed that Armenian intelligence recruited and trained Armenian members of the Daghestan-based Lezgin separatist organization "Sadval" who subsequently perpetrated a bomb attack on the Baku metro in March 1994 that killed 14 people.

Iran
According to Hema Kotecha:

Russia
In the northern regions of Azerbaijan, Russia was reported to have linkage with Lezgin separatist movement:

References

 
Azerbaijan